Sir John Barrington JP DL Kt (1824–1887), was an Irish businessman who served as Lord Mayor of Dublin in 1865 (the first time a Quaker held the office) and again in 1879. He was a member of the Irish Conservative Party. He was born on September 6, 1824 to Edward Barrington of Fassaroe, County Wicklow, and Sarah Leadbeater from Ballitore, County Kildare. He was the great-grandson of John Barrington, a tallow candler who founded the John Barrington & Sons company that made soap at their premises on Great Britain St. (now Parnell St.

In 1848, he married Elizabeth Pim (1820–1900), the daughter of Jonathan Pim and Elizabeth Goff, at the Quaker Meeting House, Monkstown, County Dublin. They had five children: Edward, Eliza Jane, Sarah, John Henry and Jonathan Pim Barrington.

While serving as Lord Mayor in 1865, he entertained Prince Albert. Barrington was knighted for his service following this visit. In 1879 he presented the US President Ulysses S. Grant with the freedom of Dublin.

Barrington was a member of the Royal Horticultural Society and the Royal Dublin Society. He was a director of the Irish Mining Company and the Dublin Commercial Gas Company.

Barrington and his wife lived in St. Anne's and later Santa Severina (now Summerhill), in Killiney, Co. Dublin.

He died on 2 May 1887, and is buried in the Friends Burial Ground in Blackrock, Dublin.

Arms

References

 

Irish Quakers
Irish justices of the peace
Lord Mayors of Dublin
Knights Bachelor
1824 births
1887 deaths
Burials at Friends Burial Ground, Dublin